Caerau (Ely) Association Football Club is a Welsh team based in Cardiff. It was formed in 1955.  The club plays in the Ardal Leagues South West, which is tier 3 of the Welsh football pyramid.

Caerau Ely were formed in 1955 joining the junior division of the Cardiff Combination League. A set of red jerseys given to the club by Mr.Ron Miller of Cross Bros. AFC was to determine the colours of the club forever. The club started its playing days on the Ely Racecourse moving on to Glyn Derw School in the eighties and then finally moving onto the Cwrt-yr-Ala ground in Ely.

In 1991 they gained entry to the new Senior League and then progressed to the CC Sports Welsh League in 1998 after beating Dinas Powys 1-0 in the play-off held at Bridgend.

The history shows that after winning well over eighty combined league titles and cups in its time, Caerau Ely has become one of the most successful clubs in Cardiff.

Season 04/05 the club gained promotion from the 3rd Division to the 2nd finishing in the third place, they carried on surviving near the bottom and scraping to safety at the end of most seasons, with most players leaving their best days behind them, the club realised they had to look at the future.

Season 06/07 saw the coming together of Caerau Ely and the youth of Llanishen Dons football club. Caerau without a representative side in the youth league approached Llanishen to invite them to join the Caerau set up. The advantages for Llanishen were obvious in that they could play at a very good level and the advantages for Caerau were that they would have a new group of young players for the future.

The first season saw the youngsters finish third in the East division and also saw a number of players move up and take their place in the senior side, the next season they finished second with even more of a presence in the first side.

Season 09/10 was the biggest in the club's history ending in promotion to Division One, winning 8 drawing 2 and with 1 loss in the last 11 games they took third place. On times the club played with a starting eleven that did not have a player over the age of 21, so the youth policy adopted in 06/07 had finally paid off.

The first Season in Division One went very well, with the club finishing with a respectful fifth place, which was the club's highest finish in their history and a great achievement.  The second season the club came up very short, with major problems trying to keep hold of players and discipline on and off the pitch returning to days the club thought they had moved on from. They finished bottom of the league.

Caerau Ely started the 2012–13 season back in Division Two after a short but eye opening period in the first division. The club employed a new team Manager in Nana Baah, who was helped by Giles Smith and Dominic Broad to try and rebuild the team.

In their first season in charge, they managed to work wonders and gain promotion back into Division One and in the process creating a new professional approach at the club. Discipline at the club was of a very good standard and major improvements have been made under the management of Nana Baah.

In 2014–15 Caerau won the Welsh League Division One title and were runners up in the league cup losing to Taff's Well A.F.C. at Jenner Park.

Current squad

Honours
Welsh League champions 2014-15
Cardiff Combination League - Champions (10): 1962–63; 1972–73; 1974–75; 1976–77; 1982–83; 1983–84; 1985–86; 1986–87; 1988–89; 1989–90

References

http://www.pitchero.com/clubs/caerauelyfc/s/team-93936.html
http://www.pitchero.com/clubs/caerauelyfc/

External links
 Official website

Football clubs in Cardiff
Football clubs in Wales
Association football clubs established in 1955
1955 establishments in Wales
Welsh Football League clubs
Cymru South clubs
South Wales Senior League clubs
Cardiff Combination League clubs
Ardal Leagues clubs